Fretibacter is a genus of bacteria from the family of Hyphomonadaceae with one known species (Fretibacter rubidus).

References

Bacteria genera
Monotypic bacteria genera